

Championship

Matches

Table

Challenge Cup / 1895 Cup

2021 squad

2021 transfers

Gains

Losses

References

2021 in rugby league by club
York City Knights